The Albany Government Law Review is a biannual student-edited law review at Albany Law School. It covers legal aspects of government and public policy. The journal hosts a symposium each year. In 2011 and 2012, the journal published a third issue focused on New York legislation.

History 
The Albany Government Law Review replaced the Environmental Outlook Journal in the 2007-2008 academic year.

Editors-in-chief 
The following persons have been editor-in-chief of the journal:

References

External links 
 

American law journals
Biannual journals
Law and public policy journals
English-language journals
Publications established in 2007
Law journals edited by students